Nkenda is a hill in Kasese District in the Western Region of Uganda. The name is also applied to the settlement at the bottom of that hill.

Location
The geographical coordinates of Nkenda are: 0°15'00.0"N, 30°06'00.0"E (Latitude:0.2500; Longitude:30.1000).

Overview
It lies along the Fort Portal-Kasese-Mpondwe Road.

Points of interest
Nkenda is a power hub in Western Uganda. The Uganda Electricity Transmission Company Limited (UETCL), maintains a high-voltage substation at this location. The  220kV Nkenda–Fort Portal–Hoima High Voltage Power Line originates here, and so does the proposed  220kV Nkenda–Mpondwe–Beni High Voltage Power Line. This location is also the terminus of the  132kV Mbarara–Nkenda High Voltage Power Line.

See also
 Energy in Uganda
 List of power stations in Uganda

References

External links
 Kasese District Leadership

Populated places in Western Region, Uganda
Cities in the Great Rift Valley
Kasese District